Kaduru, also known as Kadur, is a town and a Taluk in Chikkamagaluru district, in Karnataka. Kadur is known for Areca nut production.

Kadur is the junction for two main routes ,
The Bangalore - Shimoga highway 
And 
The Shimoga- Bangalore route

Demographics
 India census, Kadur had a population of 35436. Males constitute 51% of the population and females 49%. Kadur has an average literacy rate of 68%, higher than the national average of 59.5%: male literacy is 73%, and female literacy is 63%. In Kadur, 12% of the population is under 6 years of age.

Colleges in Kadur 
Government Pre-University College, B.H Road, Kadur-577548
Government First Grade College, B.H Road, Kadur-577548
Kuvempu university PG Center, Gedlehalli, B.H Road, Kadur-577548

Training schools in Kadur 
Police Training School,  Gedlehalli, B.H Road, Kadur-577548
Government Tool Room & Training Center, B.H Road, Kadur-577548

Nearby places
Ayyanakere Lake: 22 km from Kadur town.
Madagadakere Lake:  15 km away from Kadur town.
Hirenalluru : 15 km north east of Kadur, Hirenalluru is known for the Mallikarjuna Temple built in 8th century by Gangas. Later the Hoysala king Ballala II renovated this temple. 
Mullayyanagiri: 67 km west of Kadur, Highest peak in Karnataka With a height of 1,925 metres (6,316 ft).
Diamond falls: 26 km west of Kadur in Kamenahalli.

Transportation
 24 hours bus service to Chikkamagaluru, Mangaluru, Dharmasthala, Bengaluru, Hubballi & Mysuru.
 Have limited trains to Shivamogga, Hubballi, Bengaluru, Mysuru, Mangaluru & Chikkamagaluru & No major Inter state Fast Express trains have halt in Kadur Railway station.
 Nearest airports are Mangalore International Airport at 200kms and Kempegowda International Airport, Bengaluru at 230kms.

Roads
 NH-173 to Mangaluru, via Chikkmagalur and Mudigere.
NH 69 towards Bengaluru & Mysuru, via Banavar
SH 152 towards Belaguru & Huliyar
SH 153 towards Hirenalluru & Shivani

Railway
Kadur is a Railway Junction from where trains run in three directions i.e Chikkamagluru, Hubballi & Bengaluru.

References
Transportation

Cities and towns in Chikkamagaluru district